Harry Harding may refer to:

Harry Harding (political scientist) (born 1946), American politician scientist, China specialist
Harry Harding (politician), Canadian politician, member of the Newfoundland and Labrador House of Assembly

See also
Henry Harding (disambiguation)
Harold Harding (1900–1986), British civil engineer
Harold Hardinge, English cricketer and footballer